John Morgan McGarvey (born December 23, 1979) is an American attorney and politician serving as the U.S. representative for Kentucky's 3rd congressional district since 2023. From 2013 to 2022, he represented the 19th district in the Kentucky Senate. In 2018, he was elected minority leader, becoming one of the youngest members of a general assembly in the nation to serve in a leadership role.

Early life and education
McGarvey was born in Louisville, Kentucky, and attended duPont Manual High School. He earned a bachelor's degree in journalism from the University of Missouri and a Juris Doctor from the University of Kentucky College of Law. He is the son of John McGarvey, a staff member for former Kentucky Governor Wendell Ford and the city attorney for Anchorage, Kentucky, since 1987.

Early political career
Before his election to the Kentucky State Senate, McGarvey worked for Jack Conway as a Special Assistant Attorney General of Kentucky. He also worked for U.S. Representative Ben Chandler and the law firm Frost Brown Todd. McGarvey practices law at Morgan Pottinger McGarvey, a firm his grandfather founded.

Kentucky Senate 
McGarvey was first elected in the 2012 election for Kentucky State Senate District 19. He defeated three other candidates in the Democratic primary on May 22, 2012, with 40.7% of the vote and was unopposed in the general election on November 6. In 2016, he was reelected to a second four-year term, defeating Republican nominee Larry West in the general election. In 2018, he became minority floor leader for the Kentucky State Senate. On November 3, 2020, McGarvey was elected to a third term unopposed.

In the Senate, his committee assignments included the Appropriations and Revenue Committee, Medicaid Oversight and Advisory Committee, the Banking and Insurance Committee, the State and Local Government Committee, and the Elections, Constitutional Amendments, and Intergovernmental Affairs Task Force.

Mothers Against Drunk Driving named McGarvey its 2015 Legislator of the Year. The Foundation for Advancing Alcohol Responsibility gave him a Leadership Award. McGarvey was named a Most Valuable Policymaker by Greater Louisville Inc. and 2016 Outstanding Young Professional by the University of Kentucky College of Law.

U.S. House of Representatives

2022 election 

On October 12, 2021, McGarvey launched a campaign to represent Kentucky's 3rd congressional district after Kentucky's sole Democratic U.S. representative, John Yarmuth, announced his retirement from the seat. In the primary election, McGarvey defeated state Representative Attica Scott. McGarvey won the general election and joined Congress in January 2023.

Caucus memberships 

 Congressional Progressive Caucus
 New Democrat Coalition
 Congressional Equality Caucus

Committee assignments 

 Committee on Veterans' Affairs
 Committee on Small Business

Personal life
McGarvey and his wife, Chris, live in the Strathmoor neighborhood, a part of the Highlands in Louisville, with their three children.

The life of McGarvey's family has been documented by photographer Pam Spaulding for over forty years beginning before McGarvey was born. Spaulding began the project while working at the Louisville Courier-Journal newspaper and published photos of the McGarveys in the 2009 book An American Family: Three Decades with the McGarveys, published by National Geographic. Spaulding continues to work documenting the McGarveys today.

Electoral history

References

External links

Congressman Morgan McGarvey official U.S. House website
Morgan McGarvey for Congress campaign website
 

|-

|-

|-

|-

1979 births
21st-century American politicians
Democratic Party Kentucky state senators
Democratic Party members of the United States House of Representatives from Kentucky
Living people
Politicians from Louisville, Kentucky
University of Kentucky College of Law alumni
University of Missouri alumni